In Greek mythology, Dascylus or Daskylos is a name that may refer to:

Dascylus, a king who ruled over Mysia or Mariandyne. He is presumably the eponym of the coastal city of Dascylaeum or Dascylium (but see below).  The wife of Dascylus was Anthemoeisia, daughter of the river god Lycus, and he was the father of sons named Lycus, Priolas, and Otreus.  Dascylus' own father was the infamous Tantalus.  Priolas and Otreus were both killed by Amycus, king of Bebrycia (Bithynia); Otreus was killed while travelling to Troy to sue for the hand of King Laomedon's daughter Hesione in marriage.  Both sons have names connected with local settlements: Priola, near Heraclea, and Otrea, on the Ascanian Lake.
Dascylus, a son of Lycus, and grandson of the above Dascylus. He acted as a guide to the Argonauts.
Dascylus of Lydia (fl. late 8th to early 7th century BC), named by Herodotus as the father of Gyges.
Dascylus, father of Nacolus. His son was the eponym of the city of Nacoleia in Phrygia.
Dascylus, son of Periaudes, eponym of Dascylium, a town in Caria.

Notes

References 

 Apollodorus, The Library with an English Translation by Sir James George Frazer, F.B.A., F.R.S. in 2 Volumes, Cambridge, MA, Harvard University Press; London, William Heinemann Ltd. 1921. ISBN 0-674-99135-4. Online version at the Perseus Digital Library. Greek text available from the same website.
 Apollonius Rhodius, Argonautica translated by Robert Cooper Seaton (1853-1915), R. C. Loeb Classical Library Volume 001. London, William Heinemann Ltd, 1912. Online version at the Topos Text Project.
 Apollonius Rhodius, Argonautica. George W. Mooney. London. Longmans, Green. 1912. Greek text available at the Perseus Digital Library.
 Gaius Valerius Flaccus, Argonautica translated by Mozley, J H. Loeb Classical Library Volume 286. Cambridge, MA, Harvard University Press; London, William Heinemann Ltd. 1928. Online version at theio.com.
 Gaius Valerius Flaccus, Argonauticon. Otto Kramer. Leipzig. Teubner. 1913. Latin text available at the Perseus Digital Library.
 
 Herodotus, The Histories with an English translation by A. D. Godley. Cambridge. Harvard University Press. 1920. . Online version at the Topos Text Project. Greek text available at Perseus Digital Library.

Stephanus of Byzantium, Stephani Byzantii Ethnicorum quae supersunt, edited by August Meineike (1790-1870), published 1849. A few entries from this important ancient handbook of place names have been translated by Brady Kiesling. Online version at the Topos Text Project.

Kings in Greek mythology
Anatolian characters in Greek mythology
Mermnad dynasty